Seddon is a small town in Marlborough, New Zealand.

Salt and lime are major local industries, and the Awatere Valley is an important part of the Marlborough wine region.

The town was named for a former Prime Minister of New Zealand, Richard Seddon.

Geography

Earthquakes
Seddon has been close to the epicentres of several significant earthquakes.

On the morning of 16 October 1848, Marlborough was struck by a damaging earthquake later estimated to be between magnitude 7.4 and 7.7.  The epicentre of this earthquake was 45 km southeast of Seddon.

On 23 April 1966, a magnitude 5.8 earthquake with an epicenter in Cook Strait, 40 km east of Seddon was most strongly felt in the town, damaging the chimney on almost every house in town.
 
In July and August 2013 Seddon was closest settlement to the epicentres of a doublet earthquake event. First, in late July, a series of sizeable earthquakes struck the region over a period of a few days being felt strongly in Blenheim, Wellington and the rest of Central New Zealand, the strongest being a magnitude 6.5 and having its epicentre in Cook Strait. Then on 16 August 2013 a magnitude 6.6 earthquake with its epicentre under Lake Grassmere struck about 2:30 PM  and was followed by a series of aftershocks over the next few hours, one of which was above magnitude 6 and several others above magnitude 5. This came just a few years after devastating earthquakes affected Christchurch, 285 km away.

Demographics 
It is part of the wider Awatere statistical area.

Seddon had a population of 552 at the 2018 New Zealand census, an increase of 63 people (12.9%) since the 2013 census, and an increase of 57 people (11.5%) since the 2006 census. There were 192 households. There were 300 males and 252 females, giving a sex ratio of 1.19 males per female, with 96 people (17.4%) aged under 15 years, 93 (16.8%) aged 15 to 29, 282 (51.1%) aged 30 to 64, and 75 (13.6%) aged 65 or older.

Ethnicities were 78.3% European/Pākehā, 16.8% Māori, 13.0% Pacific peoples, 2.7% Asian, and 2.7% other ethnicities (totals add to more than 100% since people could identify with multiple ethnicities).

Although some people objected to giving their religion, 56.0% had no religion, 27.7% were Christian, 0.5% were Muslim and 2.7% had other religions.

Of those at least 15 years old, 30 (6.6%) people had a bachelor or higher degree, and 126 (27.6%) people had no formal qualifications. The employment status of those at least 15 was that 261 (57.2%) people were employed full-time, 66 (14.5%) were part-time, and 12 (2.6%) were unemployed.

Transport
State Highway 1 passes through Seddon on its route between Blenheim and Christchurch.

The Marlborough section of the Main North Line railway reached Seddon from Blenheim in October 1902. This also saw the construction of a combined road-rail bridge over the Awatere River north of the town, with the single-lane road below the rail. The bridge remained in service for road traffic until October 2007, when a new two-lane road bridge opened. Seddon was the southern terminus of the railway until the line was extended to Ward in April 1911; the full line through to Christchurch didn't open until December 1945. Today, Seddon is served by the Coastal Pacific train, which runs once daily each way during the summer months.

A train derailment at Blind River, south of Seddon, on 25 February 1948, killed six people and injured 40 others.

Education
Seddon School is the sole school in the town. The nearest state secondary schools are Marlborough Boys' College and Marlborough Girls' College in Blenheim.

References

External links

Populated places in the Marlborough Region